Anjos is a former parish (freguesia) in the municipality of Lisbon, Portugal. At the administrative reorganization of Lisbon on 8 December 2012 it became part of the parish Arroios. It was created in 1564. It has a total area of 0.48 km2 and total population of 9,738 inhabitants (2001); density: 20,372.4 inhabitants/km2.

External links
 Anjos parish website

References 

Former parishes of Lisbon